Louisiana State University Business Education Complex is a campus extension of Louisiana State University and A & M College located in Baton Rouge, Louisiana. It is designated to house part of E. J. Ourso College of Business.

The groundbreaking ceremony took place on March 19, 2010, the anticipated completion date of December 2011. The purpose of the BEC is to have the Business School located in one central area, thus creating a “campus within a campus”. The project is located on Nicholson Drive Extension next to Patrick F. Taylor Hall, formally known as Center for Engineering and Business Administration (CEBA), on LSU’s Baton Rouge campus. The BEC will consist of four buildings with approximately 156,385 square feet that will be used for undergraduate and graduate students attending Business College. It will also include a large public space for dining as well as faculty offices and offices for administration staff. One of the four buildings will house a large auditorium.

Cost/Funding
The budget for the Business Education Complex was $60 million.  At a press conference in early November 2009, Louisiana’s Governor, Bobby Jindal, announced the state would commit $30 million in capital outlay funds for the new Business Education Complex. Michael V. Martin, Chancellor at Louisiana State University and A&M College, commented that, “The Business Education Complex is a visionary example of the investment of the state of Louisiana and private citizens working together with educational institutions to improve economic sustainability and workforce development for the future” &.  Even with the State's $30 million and LSU privately raising $18 million there is a $12 million shortfall. To cover the shortfall LSU is planning to use an $8.1 million internal bridge loan that will be secured by LSU’s new revenue acquired from the Southeastern Conference’s deals with CBS and ESPN. The additional $4 million will come from the private LSU Foundation in anticipation of bequests made over the next two years. The complex is the first building on LSU’s campus that is a public-private partnership. Martin has stated with the favorable construction market he hopes the internal bridge loan of $8.1 million will not be needed.

Design of Complex

After presenting the lowest bid of $39,978,000, Lemoine / Brasfield & Gorrie was selected to construct the complex. Coleman Partners Architects designed the BEC with a blending of glass, metal and stone with sloped gabled roofs and arches in order to capture and reflect LSU’s Italianate architectural style.

The complex will consist of four buildings surrounding a 14,000 square foot exterior quadrangle lined with covered galleries. The largest building is a four story, 56,000 square foot Rotunda. This building will be used for the Business School administration offices, and academic affairs. The ground floor will have the student’s common area, lobby and café for the Business School and the community along with a Business Disaster Recovery Command Center. The second building is a two-story structure that will be the Undergraduate Pavilion, which will include classrooms,  SMART Lab and faculty offices. The third building will be known as the Graduate Pavilion and will have classrooms, study rooms, team rooms and offices for faculty. The second floor of the Undergraduate and Graduate Pavilions will contain departmental offices for Management, Marketing, ISDS, Accounting, Economics and Finance, as well as Ph.D. suites. The fourth building will be the auditorium. This two-story, 12,600 square foot building can seat 300 people and will be used by the Business School and the community. The second floor of the Auditorium will have graduate classrooms and labs. Both Pavilions and the Auditorium will connect through covered archways on the first floor and enclosed walkways on the second floor.

References

Louisiana State University buildings and structures